Porschdorf is a former municipality in the Sächsische Schweiz-Osterzgebirge district, in Saxony, Germany. With effect from 1 January 2012, it has been incorporated into the town of Bad Schandau.

References

External links 
 
 

Former municipalities in Saxony
Populated places in Saxon Switzerland
Bad Schandau